Stratemeyer may refer to:

Edward Stratemeyer (1862–1930), American publisher and writer of children's fiction
Stratemeyer Syndicate, producer of a number of children's mystery series
George E. Stratemeyer (1890–1969), United States Army Air Forces general